Wanghe Town is a town in Qianshan County, southwestern Anhui province, Eastern China. The Qian River flows through the town. Yonggang village is in the east of the town.

Agriculture 

Towns in Anhui
Qianshan, Anhui